Robert S. DesLauriers (born January 25, 1965 in Vermont) is an American businessman and property developer who was one of the originators of extreme skiing. He has skied from the summit of Mount Everest.

Early life
A graduate of Vermont Academy in 1983, DesLauriers early start with skiing and resort management began at the age of two on the slopes of Bolton Valley Ski Resort in Vermont. His parents owned, operated and managed the ski area where Rob and his siblings skied every day.

Extreme skiing
As a professional extreme skier from 1988 to 2000, DesLauriers starred in over 20 ski films and produced 5 ski films as a member of The North Face Alpine Team. Additionally, Rob served as the founder and director of worldwide Extreme Skiing Advanced Ski Clinics 1991-2000. Rob has skied from the top of 5 of the "Seven Summits" including Everest in October 2006; the Mount Vinson, Antarctica; Mount Elbrus, Russia; Kilimanjaro, Tanzania; and Denali, Alaska.

Cinematography
Rob DesLauriers is also an avid cinematographer, serving as co-founder of "Straight Up Films" with his brother Eric. DesLauriers documented the first snowboard descent of Artesonraju in Peru, and in 1999 released a backcountry adventure documentary Higher on the Mountain. DesLauriers and his brother co-wrote Ski the Whole Mountain, a book on how to ski any terrain.

Personal life
DesLauriers met his wife, Kit in 1999 while on a mountaineering trip to Mount Belukha in Siberia. Kit DesLauriers became the first person to ski the highest summits on all seven continents; with Rob providing video documentation of her feat. With Kit, DesLauriers has skied down Vinson Massif in Antarctica, and Mount Everest. The couple live in Jackson Hole, Wyoming with their children.

External links

American mountain climbers
Cornell University School of Hotel Administration alumni
1965 births
Living people
American summiters of Mount Everest
Vermont Academy alumni